AMP deaminase 1 is an enzyme that in humans is encoded by the AMPD1 gene.

Adenosine monophosphate deaminase is an enzyme that converts adenosine monophosphate (AMP) to inosine monophosphate (IMP), freeing an ammonia molecule in the process.

Function 

Adenosine monophosphate deaminase 1 catalyzes the deamination of AMP to IMP in skeletal muscle and plays an important role in the purine nucleotide cycle. Two other genes have been identified, AMPD2 and AMPD3, for the liver- and erythrocyte-specific isoforms, respectively. Deficiency of the muscle-specific enzyme is apparently a common cause of exercise-induced myopathy and probably the most common cause of metabolic myopathy in the human.

A research report shows that the widely prescribed diabetes medication metformin works on AMP-activated kinase (AMPK) by directly inhibiting AMP deaminase, thereby increasing cellular AMP.

Regulation
It has been shown that in environments with high potassium concentrations, AMP-deaminase is regulated by ATP and ADP through a “Km-type” mechanism. In low potassium ion concentrations, a mixed “Km V-type” of the regulation is observed.

Pathology 
AMPD1 deficiency, also known as myoadenylate deaminase deficiency, is a disorder in which the body produces insufficient AMP deaminase.

References

Further reading

External links
 
 

EC 3.5.4